The Parade of the Tin Soldiers (Die Parade der Zinnsoldaten), also known as The Parade of the Wooden Soldiers,  is an instrumental musical character piece, in the form of a popular jaunty march, written by German composer Leon Jessel, in 1897.

The Parade of the Tin Soldiers was originally composed for solo piano. Jessel later published it for orchestra in 1905, as Opus 123. Today, it is also a popular tune for marching bands, concert bands, and small orchestras, and for extremely diverse alternate instrumentations as well.

Since the early 1920s, the piece has been very popular in the U.S., and has also been frequently performed and recorded worldwide. A song, "The Parade of the Wooden Soldiers", was also created from the piece in 1922, with English lyrics by Ballard MacDonald.

Rise to international popularity

Recordings of The Parade of the Tin Soldiers were made in late 1910 and in 1911 and distributed internationally, and Jessel republished the sheet music internationally as well in 1911. In 1912, John Philip Sousa and his band played it at the Hippodrome Theatre in New York City.

In 1911, Russian impresario Nikita Balieff chose Jessel's whimsically rakish Parade of the Tin Soldiers for a choreography routine in his The Bat vaudeville revue, changing the title to "The Parade of the Wooden Soldiers".  Balieff's wooden-soldier choreography referenced a legend regarding Tsar Paul I: that he left his parade grounds without issuing a "halt" order to the marching soldiers, so they marched to Siberia before being remembered and ordered back.

In December 1920 Nikita Balieff's La Chauve-Souris (The Bat) revue reached Paris, to great acclaim, and in 1922 it was brought to Broadway. Balieff's entertainingly choreographed wooden-soldiers showpiece, with Jessel's popular tune, was a sensation, and a by-demand mainstay of his extremely long-running U.S. production.

Balieff's Chauve-Souris routine greatly popularized Jessel's music, and in 1922 multiple editions of the sheet music were published in the U.S. — in fox-trot, march, and concert arrangements, and for numerous instrumentations: voice and piano, with lyrics by Ballard MacDonald; male quartet; small orchestra; full orchestra; violin, piano, and cello; military band; mandolin solo; mandolin and guitar; mandolin and piano; and mandolin, guitar, and piano. In 1923, Lee DeForest filmed The Parade of the Wooden Soldiers, performed by Balieff's company, in the DeForest Phonofilm sound-on-film process. The film premiered on April 15, 1923 at the Rivoli Theater in New York City, and is now in the Maurice Zouary collection at the Library of Congress.

In 1922, the instrumental version of The Parade of the Wooden Soldiers was a hit single performed by Carl Fenton's Orchestra. Hit versions were also recorded by the Vincent Lopez Orchestra in 1922 and by Paul Whiteman and his Orchestra in 1923.

A Betty Boop cartoon, Parade of the Wooden Soldiers, was created with the music in 1933. Also in 1933, The Rockettes began annually performing their own choreographed version of the piece, based on Balieff's original, in their Radio City Christmas Spectacular. The melody was also used in the Disney cartoon Polar Trappers (1938) to accompany a scene where penguins march behind Donald Duck as he tries to lure them to a trap.

Song
Though far less often heard than Jessel's original instrumental piece, Ballard MacDonald wrote English song lyrics for the tune, in 1922.

The song is often used as a Christmas piece. A version sung by The Crystals is on the 1963 album A Christmas Gift for You from Phil Spector. Harry Connick, Jr. sings it on his 1993 album, When My Heart Finds Christmas. It is also on Disney's Very Merry Christmas Songs DVD.

Notable later uses of the instrumental piece

The Rockettes have been performing their own choreographed version of the piece, based on Balieff's La Chauve-Souris original, since 1933 in their annual Radio City Christmas Spectacular.

The work is a staple of the Boston Pops orchestra. They have recorded it at least  10 times.

In Great Britain, The Parade of the Tin Soldiers was used for many years in BBC radio's Children's Hour to introduce the series Toytown, based on stories by S. G. Hulme Beaman. The recording used was by the New Light Symphony Orchestra.

Fairport Convention's Dave Swarbrick used the main melody as one part of the medley "Royal Seleccion No 13" on their album The Bonny Bunch of Roses, where it is titled "Toytown March". The band used the medley as their set opener on more than one tour.

See also
Babes in Toyland (operetta) ("March of the Toys")
"March of the Wooden Soldiers" ("March of the Toys")
Babes in Toyland (1961 film) ("March of the Toys")
The Nutcracker ("March" in Act 1)

Notes

External links

1911 Berlin recording of The Parade of the Tin Soldiers (audio) at Russian-Records.com 
"The Parade of the Wooden Soldiers" at Hymns and Carols of Christmas. The song's history and complete lyrics.
Essay on Leon Jessel and The Parade of the Tin Soldiers by Jeff Matthews at Around Naples Encyclopedia

Songs about soldiers
Compositions by Leon Jessel
1897 compositions
1897 songs
1923 singles
Compositions for solo piano
Concert band pieces
March music
Light music compositions
Piano compositions by German composers
Compositions for chamber orchestra
Compositions for symphony orchestra
Chamber music compositions
Christmas songs
Songs with lyrics by Ballard MacDonald
Sentient toys in fiction
The Crystals songs
Song recordings produced by Phil Spector
Song recordings with Wall of Sound arrangements